Lake Barombi Koto, also known as Lake Barombi Kotto or Lake Barombi-ba-Kotto, is a small lake in the volcanic chain in the Southwest Region of Cameroon. There is a small island in the middle, which is densely inhabited by the Barombi, a tribe of fishers.

Biology
Lake Barombi Koto often appears green-brown because it is rich in phytoplankton. Invertebrates, turtles and the aquatic frog Xenopus tropicalis are common in the lake, which is also an important sanctuary for birds. Seven fish species are known from the lake, including Enteromius callipterus and a Clarias catfish, while the remaining all are cichlids: Coptodon kottae, Chromidotilapia guentheri, Hemichromis fasciatus, Pelmatolapia mariae and Sarotherodon galilaeus. Of these, C. guentheri is represented by the endemic subspecies loennbergi, while C. kottae is entirely endemic to this lake and the smaller Lake Mboandong. A review in 2008 was unable to confirm the distinction of the subspecies loennbergi compared to C. guentheri elsewhere, but the H. fasciatus in Barombi Koto and Lake Mboandong are unusually small and might be an endemic undescribed species. The endemics are threatened by pollution and sedimentation from human activities, and "turning" of the lake's water because of deforestation of the surroundings (this may allow more wind, and the lake is stratified with oxygen-poor lower levels). They are potentially also threatened by large emissions of carbon dioxide from the lake's bottom (compare Lake Nyos), although Barombi Koto is too shallow to contain very high amounts of this gas.

The nothobranchiids Aphyosemion bivittatum, Epiplatys sexfasciatus and  Fundulopanchax oeseri, the poeciliid Procatopus similis, and Barbus callipterus are found in the Tung Nsuia and Tung Nsuria streams.

Bulinus snails (including the near-endemic B. camerunensis) infested with Schistosoma, which causes the disease bilharzia in humans, are present in the lake.

Lake Mboandong

There is no inflow and the only outflow is a small stream during the wet season.

Lake Mboandong is less rich in phytoplankton and has less fish species, but all are species shared with Lake Barombi Koto and its inflowing streams: Aphyosemion bivittatum,  Fundulopanchax oeseri, Coptodon kottae, Hemichromis fasciatus and Sarotherodon galilaeus. Members of the Barombi tribe that live at Lake Barombi Koto sometimes visit Lake Mboandong to fish.

See also
 Lake Barombi Mbo
 Lake Bermin
 Lake Dissoni
 Lake Ejagham
 Lake Oku

References

Volcanic crater lakes
Lakes of Cameroon